The Patrick Mannelly Award is an award given annually in the United States to the best college football long snapper. The award is named after Duke Blue Devils alum and former Chicago Bears long snapper Patrick Mannelly. The award was founded in 2019 by Mannelly, Chris Rubio, and Kevin Gold.

Winners

References

External links
 The long snapper revolution in college football

College football national player awards
Awards established in 2019
2019 establishments in the United States